Ciampoli is an Italian surname. Notable people with the surname include:

Domenico Ciampoli (1852–1929), Italian writer
Giovanni Ciampoli (1589–1643), Italian priest, poet, and humanist
Tulia Ciámpoli (1915–1981), Argentine actress, dancer, and violinist

Italian-language surnames